Ardrossan Junior Senior High School, is a public junior high and senior high school located in Ardrossan, Alberta, Canada.

Ardrossan Jr. Sr. High School is an educational institution located approximately 30 minutes east of Edmonton in a quiet rural setting. The school is home to approximately 860 students and 60 staff members. It is a bilingual school that offers a French Immersion program from grades seven to twelve.

References

High schools in Alberta